Mike Naig (born March 2, 1978) is an American farmer and politician in the state of Iowa. A Republican, he is the current Iowa Secretary of Agriculture. He became the deputy secretary of agriculture in September 2013. After the resignation of Bill Northey, Kim Reynolds appointed Naig to succeed him in March 2018. Naig defeated Tim Gannon in the November 2018 election.

Early life
Naig was born on March 2, 1978. He grew up on a family farm near Cylinder, Iowa. He graduated from Emmetsburg High School in 1996 and attended Buena Vista University, graduating in 2000 with a bachelor's degree in biology and political science.

Political career 
Naig spent 13 years working in the agriculture industry, serving in various trade organizations. In September 2013, he became the deputy secretary of agriculture for the state of Iowa, serving under then-Iowa agriculture secretary Bill Northey. He served in this role until March 2018, when Northey was appointed Under Secretary for Farm Production and Conservation at the United States Department of Agriculture, at which point governor Kim Reynolds appointed Naig as Iowa Secretary of Agriculture to fill the vacancy left by Northey.

Naig won election to a full term as Iowa Secretary of Agriculture in November 2018, defeating Democratic challenger Tim Gannon 50% to 47%. During the primary, he received 34.7 percent of the vote, beating fellow Republican Dan Zumbach but not receiving enough votes to automatically secure the party's nomination. In the election, Naig received the backing of the Farm Bureau as well as companies like John Deere and Monsanto.

In the 2022 election, Naig ran for reelection against Democrat John Norwood. He has often spoken in favor of biofuels to combat climate change, rather than switching to electric vehicles. Naig defeated Norwood.

Personal life
Naig and his wife, Jaime, have three sons.

References

External links

Living people
1978 births
People from Palo Alto County, Iowa
Buena Vista University alumni
Iowa Republicans
Secretaries of Agriculture of Iowa
21st-century American politicians